Tere may refer to:

 Abigail Tere-Apisah (born 1992), Papua New Guinea tennis player
 Tere A. Zubizarreta
 Tere Glassie (born 1977), Australian rugby league football player
 Tere Marichal (born 1956)
 Tere O'Connor (born 1958), American dancer, choreographer and educator
 Tere Ríos, American writer
 Tere Tereba, American fashion designer, writer, and actress
 Tere Velázquez (1942–1998)
 Tere Garcia de Madero
 Tere Pica, American professor

See also